The Theban Tomb TT131 is located in Sheikh Abd el-Qurna. It forms part of the Theban Necropolis, situated on the west bank of the Nile opposite Luxor.

The tomb belongs to an 18th dynasty Ancient Egyptian named Useramen who was a Vizier during the reigns of Hatshepsut and Thutmosis III. The aged Vizier Amethu (User's father) is shown with a chamberlain, courtiers and User as a scribe before Tuthmosis III, and a text records the installation of User as co-vizier.

See also
 List of Theban tombs

References

Buildings and structures completed in the 13th century BC
Theban tombs